Carinotetraodon is a polyphyletic genus of small freshwater pufferfish found in South and Southeast Asia.Several species have commercial importance as aquarium fish.

Species
There are 6 recognized species in the genus:
	
 Carinotetraodon borneensis (Regan, 1903)
 Carinotetraodon imitator Britz & Kottelat, 1999 (dwarf Malabar pufferfish)
 Carinotetraodon irrubesco H. H. Tan, 1999 (red-tail dwarf pufferfish)
 Carinotetraodon lorteti (Tirant, 1885) (redeye pufferfish)
 Carinotetraodon salivator K. K. P. Lim & Kottelat, 1995 (striped red-eye pufferfish)
 Carinotetraodon travancoricus (Hora & K. K. Nair, 1941) (Malabar pufferfish, dwarf pufferfish, pea pufferfish)

References

Further reading
Ebert, K. Aqualog: The Puffers of Fresh and Brackish Waters. 

 
Tetraodontidae
Freshwater fish of Asia
Freshwater fish genera